Dominique Swain (born August 12, 1980) is an American actress and producer. She came to prominence playing the title character in Adrian Lyne's 1997 film adaptation of Lolita, alongside her supporting role as Jamie Archer in John Woo's Face/Off that same year. She worked predominantly in independent cinema throughout the late 90s and early 2000s. Her other film credits include Girl (1998), The Intern, The Smokers (both 2000), Happy Campers, Tart (both 2001), Pumpkin, Dead in the Water (both 2002), The Job (2003), Alpha Dog (2006), and Road to Nowhere (2010). She has since starred in a succession of features in the thriller and horror genres. In 2002, she appeared in the music video for the Moby song "We Are All Made of Stars".

Early life 
Swain was born in Malibu, California, the daughter of Cindy (née Fitzgerald) and David Swain Sr., an electrical engineer. She has two sisters, actress Chelse and Alexis.

Career 
Swain started her career in Hollywood as a stunt double; she appeared as the double for Macaulay Culkin's younger sister Quinn in Joseph Ruben's The Good Son (1993). In 1995, at the age of 15, she was chosen out of 2,500 girls to play the title role of Dolores "Lolita" Haze in Adrian Lyne's controversial 1997 screen adaptation of Lolita. She was 15 during filming and her performance was praised by critics. She later then played the rebellious teen Jamie Archer in John Woo's Face/Off (1997). She starred in the 1998 drama film Girl, in which she plays a high-schooler who is determined to lose her virginity. She then played a central role in the 2006 film Alpha Dog. In 2009, Swain appeared in Starz Inside: Sex and the Cinema which discussed the depiction of sex in film. That same year, she was featured in the movie Noble Things, about the country star Jimmy Wayne Collins, which also starred country musician Lee Ann Womack. Swain also starred in the horror/slasher film Fall Down Dead as the main character, Christie Wallace. She starred in Monte Hellman's romance thriller Road to Nowhere in 2010. In 2011, Swain was featured in David Ren's action thriller The Girl from the Naked Eye. She starred in the direct-to-video science fiction film Nazis at the Center of the Earth in 2012. In 2013, Swain starred in Gregory Hatanaka's drama film Blue Dream as Gena Townsend. In 2015 she was in the independent action film Skin Traffik alongside Mickey Rourke, Daryl Hannah, Eric Roberts and Michael Madsen,

Campaigning 
In 2001, at the age of 21, Swain posed nude for PETA's "I'd Rather Go Naked than Wear Fur" campaign.

Filmography

Film

Television

Music videos

Awards and nominations

References

External links 
 

Actresses from California
American film actresses
American television actresses
Living people
People from Greater Los Angeles
People from Malibu, California
20th-century American actresses
21st-century American actresses
1980 births